Joseph Paul Fitzgibbon (March 21, 1903 – March 12, 1975) was a professional American football player who played wide receiver for six seasons for the Duluth Eskimos, Frankford Yellow Jackets, Chicago Cardinals, and Green Bay Packers.  Following his football career Paul Fitzgibbon became a neurologist and later one of the seven founding members of the Permanente Medical Group, now Kaiser Permanente.

References

1903 births
American football wide receivers
Chicago Cardinals players
Creighton Bluejays football players
Duluth Eskimos players
Frankford Yellow Jackets players
Green Bay Packers players
Players of American football from South Dakota
1975 deaths